This is a timeline of women in photography tracing the major contributions women have made to both the development of photography and the outstanding photographs they have created over the 19th, 20th and 21st centuries.

Early 19th-century pioneers

1839
 Sarah Anne Bright (1793–1866) produces what is possibly the earliest surviving photographic image taken by a woman.
Constance Fox Talbot (1811–1880), wife of the inventor Henry Fox Talbot, experiments with the process of photography, possibly becoming the first woman to take a photograph.

1842
Franziska Möllinger (1817–1880) becomes the first female photographer in Switzerland, taking daguerreotypes of Swiss scenes which she publishes as lithographs in 1844.

1843
Anna Atkins (1799–1871), also a friend of Henry Fox Talbot, publishes Photographs of British Algae: Cyanotype Impressions, the first book with photographic illustrations.
Bertha Beckmann (1815–1901), opens a studio with her husband in Leipzig, running the business herself from his death in 1847.

1844
Jessie Mann (1805–1867) takes a photograph of the King of Saxony, probably becoming the first woman photographer in Scotland.

1845
Brita Sofia Hesselius (1801–1866) makes daguerreotypes in her photographic studio in Karlstad, moving her studio to Stockholm in 1857.

1847
Geneviève Élisabeth Disdéri (c.1817–1878) assists her husband André-Adolphe-Eugène Disdéri in their Brest studio, later operating the business alone.

1848
Sarah Louise Judd (1802–c.1881) makes daguerreotypes in spring 1848, continuing for two years in Stillwater, Minnesota.

1849
Elise L'Heureux (1827–1896), together with her husband, sets up a daguerreotype studio in Quebec City, taking over the business in 1865.

Later 19th-century

1850
Julia Shannon (c. 1812 – c. 1852), the first known woman photographer in California, advertises her work with daguerreotypes in 1850.
Thora Hallager (1821–1884) begins making daguerreotypes in Copenhagen, opening her own studio around 1857.

1852
Emilie Bieber (1810–1884) opens a daguerreotype studio in Hamburg.
Marie Kinnberg opens a daguerreotype studio in Gothenburg.

1854
Caroline Emily Nevill (1829–1887) and her sisters Henrietta (1830–1912) and Isabel (1831–1915) exhibit at the London Photographic Society.

1856
Virginia Oldoini (1837–1899) began taking photographs, mainly of herself in theatrical costumes.
Julia Ann Rudolph (also known as Julia Ann Swift and Julia Ann Raymond; c. 1820–1890) sets up her own photography studio in Nevada City, California.

1857
Lady Clementina Hawarden (1822–1865) begins photographing in Ireland, later setting up her own private studio in London where she produced some 800 albumen prints.

1863 
Emma Kirchner (1830 – 1909) sets up as the first woman photographer in her studio in Delft, Netherlands.

1864
Julia Margaret Cameron (1815–1879) begins taking photographs, becoming famous for her portraits of celebrities.
Louise Thomsen (1823–1907) establishes a business in Hellebæk near Helsingør.

1867
Elizabeth Pulman (1836–1900) assists her husband in his Auckland studio, taking over the business on his death in 1871.

1869
Thora Hallager photographs Hans Christian Andersen.

1871
 Adelaide Conroy was operating from 56, Strada Stretta, Valletta, Malta, until mid 1879 specialising mostly in carte de visite and albumen print.

1876
Frederikke Federspiel (1839–1913) is the first woman in Denmark to obtain a licence to trade in photography.

1880s
Mollie Fly (1847–1925) ran a photo studio from the 1880s to the early 1910s in Tombstone, Arizona.

1881
Geraldine Moodie (1854–1945) establishes a studio in Battleford, Saskatchewan. She was later commissioned to create photographic records of western Canada.

1888
Mary Steen (1856–1939) becomes Denmark's first female court photographer.

1890
Sarah J. Eddy (1851–1945) begins exhibiting photographs. Her most important exhibitions were at the New School of American Photography and the selection of American Women photographers at the Paris Universal Exposition of 1900.

1894
Frances Benjamin Johnston (1864–1952) becomes the first women to open a studio in Washington, D.C.

1895
Julie Laurberg (1856–1925) opens a large successful photography business in Copenhagen's Magasin du Nord where she employed many women. Supported women's professional participation in photography.

1896
Harriett Brims (1864–1939) opens a studio in Ingham, Queensland, working as a professional photographer for 16 years.

1899
Laura Adams Armer becomes active as a photographer in San Francisco photographing Chinatown and other areas of interest.

Early 20th century

1900
Gertrude Käsebier (1852–1934) sold prints of her 1899 photograph "The Manger" (a portrait of fellow photographer Frances W. Delehanty) for $100, "the highest price ever paid for a photograph" to that time.

1901
Ladies' Home Journal featured a series of articles, "The Foremost Women Photographers in America", edited by Frances Benjamin Johnston and including Gertrude Käsebier (May), Mathilde Weil (June), The Allen Sisters (July), Emma J. Farnsworth (August), Eva Watson-Schütze (October), Zaida Ben-Yusuf (November), and Elizabeth Brownell (January 1902).

1903

Sarah Acland is taking colour photos whilst on holiday in Gibraltar.
Christina Broom (1862–1939) starts selling photographs as postcards, later becoming the first female press photographer.

1906
 Signe Brander (1869–1942) is charged by the City of Helsinki to document photographically the changing face of the city.

1907
Dora Kallmus (1881–1963) establishes a fashion studio in Vienna, later creating portraits of celebrities.

1909
The Women's Federation of the Photographers Association of America holds its organizational meeting in Rochester, New York, with Mary Carnell as its first president.

1913
Margaret Watkins (1884–1969) works as an assistant in a Boston studio, opening her own business in New York City in 1920.

1915
Katherine Russell Bleecker (1893–1996) makes three films about prison reform this year, using her own cameras. She is sometimes credited as the first professional camerawoman in American film.

1916
Trude Fleischmann (1895–1990) embarks on her career as a professional photographer, creating outstanding portraits of intellectuals and artists.

1917
Naciye Suman (1881–1973) creates a studio in Istanbul, becoming Turkey's first female photographer.

1920s
Marie al-Khazen (1899–1983) was a Lebanese photographer active in the 1920s; the photographs she created are considered to constitute a valuable and unique record of their time and place.
Elise Forrest Harleston (February 8, 1891 – 1970) was an early African-American photographer who set up a studio in Charleston, South Carolina, in 1922 that lasted into the early 1930s.
Ruth Matilda Anderson (1893 – 1983), a graduate of the Clarence H. White School of Photography, starts taking more than 14.000 documentary photographs of rural life in early 20th-century Spain for the Hispanic Society of America. Her work has found appreciation after her death in exhibitions and catalogs.

1925
Ruth Harriet Louise (1903–1940) is hired by Metro-Goldwyn-Mayer to run their portrait studio, becoming the first female photographer to be active in Hollywood.

1928
Margaret Bourke-White (1904–1971) opens a studio in Cleveland, Ohio, becoming a photojournalist in 1929.

1932
Ylla (1911–1955) begins photographing animals, later becoming recognized as the world's most proficient animal photographer.

1936
Ilse Bing (1899–1998) creates monochrome images which are exhibited at the Louvre and New York's Museum of Modern Art.
Gerda Taro (1910–1937) is killed while covering the Spanish Civil War, becoming the first woman photojournalist to have died while working on the frontline.

1939
Homai Vyarawalla begins contributing to The Illustrated Weekly of India, developing a career as India's first female press photographer.
Berenice Abbott publishes her work of bird's eye and worm's eye view photographs of New York City in Changing New York.

1940s
 Tsuneko Sasamoto (born 1914) joins the Japanese Photographic Society in 1940, becoming Japan's first woman photojournalist.
Carlotta Corpron (December 9, 1901 – April 17, 1988) begins making the "light drawings" that establish her as a pioneer of American abstract photography.

1941
Margaret Bourke-White (1904–1971) becomes the first female war correspondent.
Dorothea Lange (1895–1965) is awarded a Guggenheim Fellowship.

1945
Marion Carpenter (1920–2002) becomes a White House photographer, frequently travelling with President Truman.

Late 20th century

1950
Thousands of striking 19th-century photographs made by Staten Island photographer Alice Austen (1866-1952) were rediscovered and published.

1954
Virginia Schau (1915–1989) becomes the first women to win the Pulitzer Prize for Photography.

1962
Agnès Varda (born 1928) releases her French New Wave film Cléo from 5 to 7.

1967
Polish-born Rose Mandel (1910–2002), senior photographer in the art department at the University of California, is awarded a Guggenheim Fellowship.

1972
Belgian-born Liliane de Cock (1939–2013), photographic assistant to Ansel Adams from 1963 to 1972, is awarded a Guggenheim Fellowship.
Lorraine Monk (born c.1926) is honoured as an Officer of the Order of Canada for her contributions to photography.

1973 

 Sara Facio and María Cristina Orive co-found La Azotea, the first publishing house in Latin America dedicated to photography.

1974 

 Letizia Battaglia begins her career photographing the Sicilian Mafia.

1978 

Graciela Iturbide (born 1942) becomes one of the founding members of the Mexican Council of Photography.

1979 

 Sara Facio, Alicia D'Amico, Annemarie Heinrich, and Maria Cristina Orive are all part of the group of original founders of the Consejo Argentino de Fotografía.

1980 

Jane Evelyn Atwood receives the first W. Eugene Smith Grant for humanistic photography for her project on the lives of blind children.

1991
Annie Leibovitz becomes the first woman to hold an exhibition at Washington's National Portrait Gallery.

21st century

2005
Anja Niedringhaus (1965–2014) wins the Pulitzer Prize for Breaking News Photography for her coverage of the Iraq War.
Bearing Witness, a documentary for American television, follows five women war journalists working in Iraq, including photographer Molly Bingham and camerawoman Mary Rogers.

2010
Raymonde April (born 1953) is awarded the Order of Canada for her contribution to photography.

See also
List of women photographers
Women photographers

References

Women photographers
History of photography
photography
Women's history